The 2011 Pacific Games football tournament was an international football tournament held in New Caledonia from 27 August until 9 September 2011. The 11 national teams involved in the tournament were required to register a squad of players; only players in these squads were eligible to take part in the tournament.

Players marked (c) were named as captain for their national squad. Players' club teams and players' age as of 27 August 2011 – the tournament's opening day.

Group A

Tuvalu
Coach:  Foppe de Haan

American Samoa
Coach: Iofi Lalogafuafua

Solomon Islands
Coach: Jacob Moli

Guam
Coach:  Kazuo Uchida

New Caledonia
Coach:  Christophe Coursimault

Vanuatu
Coach: Saby Natonga

Group B

Papua New Guinea
Coach:  Frank Farina

Cook Islands
Coach:  Maurice Tillotson

Fiji
Coach: Gurjit Singh

Tahiti
Coach: Eddy Etaeta

Kiribati
Coach: Pine Iosefa

References

Squads